The Penn State College of Agricultural Sciences offers 17 undergraduate majors, 23 minors, and graduate programs in 18 major areas. The college awarded the nation's first baccalaureate degrees in agriculture in 1861.

With 9 academic departments and 67 cooperative extension offices, one in each of Pennsylvania's counties, the college is widely recognized as one of the nation's top institutions for agricultural research and education programs.

History

In 1855, before the Penn State College of Agricultural Sciences, it was a high school known as The Farmer's High School run by Evan Pugh. Pugh helped to transform the Farmer's High School into the Penn State College of Agricultural Sciences by supporting Congress to pass the Morrill Land-Grant Act. The only land-grant university in Pennsylvania, Penn State became one of the nation's very first when President Abraham Lincoln signed the Morrill Act into law in 1862. As a result, government receives money from the sales of land to help fund a college that would teach people better farming methods. In addition to learning farming methods, Pugh had contributed other subjects to the college including chemistry, geology, mathematics, and mineralogy. Not only did he contributed knowledge to the college but he also donated money towards the laboratory buildings and research. Pugh died on April 29, 1864. Today, he is known as the first President of The Pennsylvania State University and the highest award a professor can receive at the university is named after him which is called the "Evan Pugh Professors."

Academics
Undergraduate students can choose from 17 majors, 24 minors, and three two-year associate degree programs. Graduate programs are offered in 18 major areas within the college, and faculty participate in 10 inter-college programs and seven dual-title degree options.

Academic departments
The college is organized into nine academic departments:

Extension Services 
Penn State Extension Services is the "extension" of the College of Agricultural Sciences that serves the general public. Extension Services were officially organized in 1907, assigned the nation's first county agent to Bedford County in 1910, and had full-time extension agents in sixty-two of the sixty-seven Pennsylvania counties by 1921. Penn State Extension Services is currently organized into seven administrative units.

Research
The Penn State College of Agricultural Sciences invests nearly $97 million in research and graduate study yearly. Scientists in the college are seeking solutions to the agricultural and ecological problems of our time by conducting basic and applied research focusing on cross-cutting thematic areas.

Research and Extension Centers 
Penn State operates four agricultural research and extension centers where scientists conduct applied research in real-world conditions and show the results of that research to farmers. The Russell E. Larson Agricultural Research Center, located in Rock Springs a few miles southwest of State College in central Pennsylvania, is the largest of Penn State's research centers at over 2,000 acres and supports the wide range of applied agricultural research that is conducted at the University Park campus. This is the location of Ag Progress Days, Pennsylvania’s largest outdoor agricultural exposition. The Fruit Research and Extension Center, located in Biglerville in Adams County in the tree fruit belt of south-central Pennsylvania, primarily focuses on apples and peaches, but also has cherries, plums, nectarines, and pears. The Southeast Agricultural Research and Extension Center, located in Landisville in Lancaster county in southeastern Pennsylvania, primarily focuses on agronomic crops, vegetables, small fruits, and flowers. The Lake Erie Regional Grape Research and Extension Center, located in Northeast in Erie County in the Lake Erie grape belt of northwestern Pennsylvania, primarily focuses on processing grapes, but also has some wine grapes.

PlantVillage
PlantVillage was founded by David Hughes, professor at Penn state university.

PlantVillage Nuru
Nuru is an artificial intelligence/machine learning mobile app that automatically diagnoses Cassava diseases, fall armyworm in maize/corn, potato diseases, and wheat diseases. It is Swahili for 'light' to symbolize how the app can bring light to smallholder farmers in Africa who typically lack access to expert knowledge systems.

Enrollment
 Approximate total college undergraduate enrollment: 3,000
 Approximate college undergraduate enrollment at University Park campus: 2,100
 Total college graduate student enrollment: 580

Scholarships
 The college has one of Penn State's largest scholarship programs, awarding nearly $2 million to nearly 700 students annually.

Contributions
The Penn State College of Agricultural Sciences has made many contributions in recent history. One example includes Penn State's research in unraveling the mystery of Colony collapse disorder (CCD). CCD is when bees suddenly disappear and do not return to their hives. Bees are important in producing honey and also pollinating plants. The E.B. O'Keeffe Foundation donated $100,000 to Penn State for research in CCD.  
Penn State is also making contributions towards protecting water quality. Fresh water is a limited resource, and Penn State is doing research to improve and sustain our fresh water resources. Water could become scarce someday, becoming the next generation's new oil. 
There are countless other amounts of research and contributions that Penn State is making to the world.

See also

List of agricultural universities and colleges
List of colleges and universities in Pennsylvania

References

External links
 

Pennsylvania State University colleges
Agricultural universities and colleges in the United States
Educational institutions established in 1861
1861 establishments in Pennsylvania